Gilmore is an unincorporated community in Lemhi County, in the U.S. state of Idaho.

History
A post office called Gilmore was established in 1902, and remained in operation until 1957. The community was named after John T. "Jack" , a businessperson in the stage coach industry (a postal error accounts for the error in spelling, which was never corrected).

Gilmore's population was 50 in 1909, and was just 5 in 1960.

References

Unincorporated communities in Lemhi County, Idaho
Unincorporated communities in Idaho